Benja (Benjamín Martínez Martínez) (born 23 August 1987) is a Spanish professional footballer who plays as a forward for CF Intercity.

He played 142 games and scored 24 goals in the Segunda División for Barcelona B, Girona, Las Palmas, Sabadell, Llagostera and Elche, adding 159 matches and 56 goals in the Segunda División B for four clubs.

Club career
Born in Sant Cugat del Vallès, Barcelona, Catalonia, Benja concluded his youth development at CF Damm before joining RCD Espanyol B in 2006, spending his tenure on loan at CE Europa. Two years later, he joined another reserve team, FC Barcelona B, and after a loan at CF Reus Deportiu he scored eight goals in 26 games in his first season as they won promotion from Segunda División B, including a hat-trick in a 3–3 away draw against Polideportivo Ejido in the first leg of the play-off first round.

On 14 July 2011, Benja transferred to Segunda División side Girona FC, totalling 14 goals in 53 competitive matches over the next two campaigns, two of those coming in the first 11 minutes of a 3–1 home win over Sporting de Gijón on 29 September 2012. The following 24 February he suffered a serious left knee injury against Córdoba CF, but he nonetheless agreed to sign for this club on 27 June; the deal was frozen until his recovery. 

After terminating his contract in January 2014, Benja joined another second-division team, UD Las Palmas, on the anniversary of his injury. The following 7 January he returned to his native region once more, after being loaned to CE Sabadell FC for the rest of the campaign, which ended in relegation. 

On 27 July 2016, after suffering the same fate with UE Llagostera, Benja dropped into division three for the first time in six years, moving to Cultural y Deportiva Leonesa. Roughly one year later, after scoring a career-best 25 goals – 26 overall – to help them to return to the second tier after 42 years, the 30-year-old joined Elche CF.

In his first season at the Estadio Martínez Valero, Benja scored 14 times in all competitions, including the crucial goal in a 3–2 aggregate victory over Villarreal CF B in the playoff final to reach the second division on 23 June 2018. Having not added another goal, he joined neighbouring Hércules CF in February 2019 on a short-term loan to cover the long-term injury of Stephane Emaná; in July, following a playoff final defeat to SD Ponferradina, he signed a two-year deal.

Honours
Cultural Leonesa
Segunda División B: 2016–17

References

External links

1987 births
Living people
People from Sant Cugat del Vallès
Sportspeople from the Province of Barcelona
Spanish footballers
Footballers from Catalonia
Association football forwards
Segunda División players
Segunda División B players
Tercera División players
Primera Federación players
Segunda Federación players
CF Damm players
RCD Espanyol B footballers
CE Europa footballers
FC Barcelona Atlètic players
CF Reus Deportiu players
Girona FC players
Córdoba CF players
UD Las Palmas players
CE Sabadell FC footballers
UE Costa Brava players
Cultural Leonesa footballers
Elche CF players
Hércules CF players
CF Intercity players